Haugland is a Norwegian surname from any of numerous farmsteads in Norway. From Old Norse word haugr meaning  hill or mound. Other derivatives include Hauge, Haugan and Haugen, all common Norwegian family names. Notable people with the surname include:

Aage Haugland (1944-2000), Danish operatic bass
Åshild Haugland (born 1986), a Norwegian politician
Baard Madsen Haugland (1835-1896), Norwegian politician
Bill Haugland, Canadian television news anchorman
Brynhild Haugland (1905-1998), American Republican Party politician
Curly Haugland, American politician, member of the RNC rules committee.
Eugen Haugland (1912-1990), Norwegian triple jumper
Glenn Erik Haugland (born 1961), an American contemporary composer
Hanne Haugland (born 1967), Norwegian high jumper
Hanne Haugland (born 1991), a Norwegian speed skater
Ian Haugland (born 1964), Swedish drummer
Jens Haugland (1910-1991), Norwegian politician
Jens Edv. Haugland (1924-1981), Norwegian politician
John Haugland (born 1946), Norwegian former rally driver
Knut Haugland (1917-2009), Norwegian resistance fighter, noted explorer, and crewmember of Kon-Tiki
Richard P. (Dick) Haugland (1943-2016), American scientist, inventor and philanthropist
Sven A. Haugland (born 1948), Norwegian organizational theorist 
Terje Haugland (born 1944), Norwegian long jumper
Trond Inge Haugland (born 1976), a former Norwegian football player
Tove Welle Haugland (born 1989), a Norwegian politician
Valgerd Svarstad Haugland (born 1956), Norwegian leader of the Christian Democratic Party
Vernon Arnold Haugland (1908-1984), an American reporter

Norwegian-language surnames